Eric Kleybel Ramírez Matheus (born 20 November 1998) is a Venezuelan professional footballer who plays as a forward for Ukrainian club Dynamo Kyiv.

Club career

Karviná
He signed for the Czech First League side Karviná from Zamora in 2017. He scored his first goal for them on 24 September in their 2–1 home win against Zbrojovka Brno.

Loan to Senica
On 7 February 2019, Ramirez was loaned out to Senica for the rest of the season.

Dynamo Kyiv
On 23 July 2021, Ramirez signed a 5 year contract with the Ukrainian champions Dynamo Kyiv.

Loan to Sporting Gijón
On 30 January 2022 he went to Sporting Gijón on loan.

International career
He made his debut for Venezuela national football team on 13 October 2020 in a World Cup qualifier against Paraguay. He substituted Cristian Cásseres Jr. in the 89th minute.

Career statistics

Club

International

Scores and results list Venezuela's goal tally first, score column indicates score after each Ramírez goal.

References

External links 
 
 
 
 Eric Ramírez profile on the MFK Karviná official website

1998 births
Living people
People from Barinas (state)
Venezuelan footballers
Venezuela international footballers
Venezuelan expatriate footballers
Association football forwards
Zamora FC players
Estudiantes de Caracas players
MFK Karviná players
FK Senica players
FC DAC 1904 Dunajská Streda players
FC Dynamo Kyiv players
Sporting de Gijón players
ŠK Slovan Bratislava players
Venezuelan Primera División players
Czech First League players
Slovak Super Liga players
Ukrainian Premier League players
Expatriate footballers in the Czech Republic
Venezuelan expatriate sportspeople in the Czech Republic
Expatriate footballers in Slovakia
Venezuelan expatriate sportspeople in Slovakia
Expatriate footballers in Ukraine
Venezuelan expatriate sportspeople in Ukraine
Expatriate footballers in Spain
Venezuelan expatriate sportspeople in Spain